ZTV was a Swedish television channel owned by Viasat. Launched in February 1991, as a daily afternoon show on TV3 and TV4, it became a channel of its own on Swedish cable networks in May 1992. The intention was to create a Swedish version of MTV and thus the focus was primarily on music, but also had their own comedy-oriented shows, skate and prank related shows and aired various tv shows and movies. Since May 2006, most of its programming composed of music videos. ZTV's last day was August 1, 2010 for all customers except for Boxer and Com Hem, who continued to distribute the channel indefinitely in a limited version. MTG's new sports channel TV10 took over the transmissions of other operators.

History
ZTV was initially also a combined radio station called Z-Radio. The sound from the television programme went out also in radio through a number of community radio frequencies around the country. ZTV began broadcasting on their own channel position in 1992 and was owned by MTG, who also owned TV3 (Sweden) and TV6 (Sweden). Aside from music videos the channel featured many shows produced in Sweden. Although they were low budget they also featured new ideas and many of them received cult status. Most of the presenters went on to become stars on the major networks with ZTV being viewed as a breeding ground for new talent.

For a few years, there was a Danish ZTV, but it eventually merged with Danish TV6 to form TV3+ and was closed down in 1996. There were also plans to merge the Swedish ZTV with the Swedish TV6, but this never materialised.

As the years went on, ZTV moved from Stockholm to London and started broadcasting US imports such as The Late Show with David Letterman and The Simpsons. ZTV started broadcasting 24 hours a day in 2000. In 2002, a Norwegian version of ZTV launched, ZTV Norway.

September 2004 marked a significant change in style for the channel. Instead of being a youth channel, ZTV would now target men. As a result, most of the in-house ZTV shows were cancelled and replaced by Champions League football and wrestling.

In May 2006, MTG started a new channel called TV6. This channel took over most of the programming from ZTV, as well as its frequencies in the cable networks. This meant that ZTV would only broadcast music videos and lost all of its distribution.

In late 2007, ZTV started to broadcast various anime series such as Berserk, Black Lagoon, Ergo Proxy, Fullmetal Alchemist, Gungrave, Naruto, Ninja Scroll, Paranoia Agent, and Samurai Champloo.

There was also a Z magazine available for some time.

Productions

See also 
TV3
TV8
TV1000
Modern Times Group
List of Swedish television channels

References

External links 
ZTV Sweden

Defunct television channels in Sweden
Television channels and stations established in 1992
ZTV Sweden
1992 establishments in Sweden
2010 disestablishments in Sweden
Television channels and stations disestablished in 2010